Bugged may refer to:

 Bugged!, a 1997 horror-comedy film distributed by Troma
 Bugged (album), a 2000 album by Babybird
 "Bugged" (Blood Ties), an episode of Blood Ties
 "Bugged" (Family Matters), an episode of Family Matters
 "Bugged", an episode of Delilah and Julius
 Bugged, to have placed, or to have been monitored by, a covert listening device

See also 
 Bug (disambiguation)